Ulla Renvall is a former Swedish Paralympic nordic skiing and athletics coach.

During the 2006 Winter Paralympics she was inducted into the Paralympic Hall of Fame.

Biography

Trained athletes
1976 Winter Paralympics: Birgitta Sundh
1980 Winter Paralympics: Birgitta Sundh, Desiree Johansson
1984 Summer Paralympics: Monica Wetterström, Gunnar Tomsson
1988 Summer Paralympics: Monica Wetterström
1992 Summer Paralympics: Monica Wetterström

Achievements

References

External links
 Coach profile at IPC web site

Paralympic athletics (track and field) coaches
Paralympic cross-country skiing coaches
Coaches at the 1988 Summer Paralympics
Coaches at the 1992 Summer Paralympics
Living people
Year of birth missing (living people)